Seven veils may refer to:
Dance of the Seven Veils (film)

Dance
 The Dance of the Seven Veils performed by Salomé, one of the elaborations on the biblical tale of the execution of John the Baptist, wherein she dances to inflame King Herod with incestuous desire so that he would treat John as she wished.

Music
 Dance of the Seven Veils, a leitmotif from Salome (opera) (1905) by Richard Strauss
 Seven Veils, a 1927 song by Buddy DeSylva, Lew Brown and Ray Henderson
 Dance of the Seven Veils, a 1996 album by Newband
 "Dance of the Seven Veils", a song by Liz Phair from her 1993 album Exile in Guyville
 Seven Veils (Robert Rich album), a 1998 album by Robert Rich
 "The Seven Veils", a song on the 1993 album The Swining by Raymond Watts (as PIG)
 Seven Veils of Silence, a 2004 album by Hecate (musician)
 Seven Veils, a 1989 song on the album Deep by Peter Murphy